Fuller House may refer to:

Places 
Granville Fuller House, Aurora, Colorado, listed on the National Register of Historic Places (NRHP) in Adams County
Montezuma Fuller House, Fort Collins, Colorado, listed on the NRHP in Larimer County
John Fuller House, Suffield, Connecticut, listed on the NRHP in Hartford County
Fuller House (Washington, D.C.), listed on the NRHP
R. Buckminster Fuller and Anne Hewlett Dome Home, Carbondale, Illinois, listed on the NRHP in Jackson County
W. Joseph Fuller House, Muscatine, Iowa, listed on the NRHP in Muscatine County
Fuller House (Minden, Louisiana), listed on the NRHP in Webster Parish
Fuller-Weston House, Augusta, Maine, listed on the NRHP in Kennebec County
Fuller-Baker Log House, Grantsville, Maryland, listed on the NRHP in Garrett County
Fuller House (Barnstable, Massachusetts), listed on the NRHP in Barnstable County
Margaret Fuller House, Cambridge, Massachusetts, listed on the NRHP in Middlesex County
Joseph Fuller House, Middleton, Massachusetts, listed on the NRHP in Essex County
Lieut. Thomas Fuller House, Middleton, Massachusetts, listed on the NRHP in Essex County
Amos Fuller House, Needham, Massachusetts, listed on the NRHP in Norfolk County
Robert Fuller House, Needham, Massachusetts, listed on the NRHP in Norfolk County
Capt. Edward Fuller Farm, Newton, Massachusetts, listed on the NRHP in Middlesex County
Enoch Fuller House, Stoneham, Massachusetts, listed on the NRHP in Middlesex County
William Griffin Fuller House, Stoneham, Massachusetts, listed on the NRHP in Middlesex County
Fuller-Dauphin Estate, Taunton, Massachusetts, listed on the NRHP in Bristol County
Fuller-Bemis House, Waltham, Massachusetts, listed on the NRHP in Middlesex County
Pierce-Fuller House, Red River, New Mexico, listed on the NRHP in Taos County
Royal K. Fuller House, Colonie, New York, listed on the NRHP in Albany County
James and Lydia Canning Fuller House, Skaneateles, New York, listed on the NRHP in Onondaga County
Fuller House (Syracuse, New York), listed on the NRHP in Onondaga County
Fuller House (Louisburg, North Carolina), listed on the NRHP in Franklin County
Fuller-Bramley House, Independence, Ohio, listed on the NRHP in Cuyahoga County
Frances Ensign Fuller House, Madison, Ohio, listed on the NRHP in Lake County
Fuller House (Utica, Ohio)|Fuller House, National Register of Historic Places listings in Licking County, Ohio|listed on the NRHP in Licking County
Fuller Houses, Pawtucket, Rhode Island, listed on the NRHP in Providence County
Fuller House (Euless, Texas), a Depression-era house museum in Tarrant County

Television
"Fuller House" (Full House), a fourth-season episode of the television sitcom Full House
Fuller House (TV series), a Netflix sequel series to the sitcom Full House

See also
Full House (disambiguation)